Beauregard is an unincorporated community located in central Lee County, Alabama, United States.  It is located east of Auburn and south of Opelika.

History 
Beauregard was settled in the late 19th century and was named for Confederate General P.G.T. Beauregard. There are also some unidentified ruins along Road 166 that sit behind the limestone quarry.

On March 3, 2019, Beauregard was hit by a long-tracked EF4 tornado. Many homes and businesses were severely damaged or destroyed, and 23 people were killed.

Geography
While Beauregard has been traditionally considered to be a small area near the crossroads of Alabama State Route 51 and Lee County Road 400, today most residents within a roughly 25 square mile (65 km2) area surrounding the original community consider themselves to be in "Beauregard".

Via AL-51, Opelika, the Lee County seat, is 8 mi (13 km) north, and Marvyn is 8 mi (13 km) south.

Demographics
Beauregard is part of the Auburn Metropolitan Area.

Education
Schools
Beauregard Elementary (K–4)
Sanford Middle School (5–8)
Beauregard High School (9–12), 2016 Alabama 5A State Champions

The mascot of all three schools is the Hornet.

Gallery

References

Notes

Sources
Nunn, Alexander (Ed.) (1983). Lee County and Her Forebears.  Montgomery, Ala., Herff Jones. LCCCN 83-081693
Wright, John Peavy (1969).  Glimpses into the past from my Grandfather's Trunk.  Alexander City, Ala., Outlook Publishing Company, Inc.  LCCCN 74-101331

Unincorporated communities in Alabama
Unincorporated communities in Lee County, Alabama
Columbus metropolitan area, Georgia